Veluchamy Thevar was an Indian politician and former Member of the Legislative Assembly. He was elected to the Tamil Nadu legislative assembly as an Independent candidate from Alangulam constituency in 1957 election.

Electoral performance

References 

Tamil Nadu politicians